Clethra alnifolia, the coastal sweetpepperbush or summersweet, is a species of flowering plant in the genus Clethra of the family Clethraceae, native to eastern North America from southern Nova Scotia and Maine south to northern Florida, and west to eastern Texas. It is a deciduous shrub which grows in wetlands, bogs and woodland streams.

Description
The leaves are obovate to oblong, 4–10 cm long and 2–4 cm broad, with a serrated margin; they are green turning yellow-golden during the autumn. The flowers are white or very pale pink, 5–10 mm in diameter, and have a sweet, somewhat cloying fragrance. The flowers are attractive to bumblebees; they are produced in racemes up to 15 cm long and 2 cm broad in late summer, depending on the cultivar. The "pepper" part of the common name derives from the mature fruits, capsules which have a vague resemblance to peppercorns, however with no element of spiciness.

Habitat
It grows in wet forests, pine flatwoods, wetlands, bogs and can be seen alongside woodland streams. It prefers a neutral to acidic soil. The Nova Scotia population is small and endangered.

Etymology
The Latin specific epithet alnifolia means "with leaves like alder (Alnus)". This gave rise to another common name, common white alder, though the two plants are not closely related.

Cultivation
C. alnifolia is typically used as a shrub for natural gardens, or is placed alongside a stream or pond to delay erosion. It does not leaf out until very late in the season, limiting its landscaping use. Several cultivars have been selected for garden use, including 'September Beauty'. Both 'Ruby Spice',  with strongly pink flowers, and the dwarf 'Hummingbird'  have gained the Royal Horticultural Society's Award of Garden Merit (confirmed 2017).

References

External links
Connecticut Botanical Society  
Virginia Tech Dendrology
Canadian Biodiversity: Clethra alnifolia in Nova Scotia

alnifolia
Flora of Canada
Flora of the Eastern United States
Plants described in 1753
Taxa named by Carl Linnaeus